Alkaliphilus transvaalensis is an extremely alkaliphilic bacterium. Its cells are straight to slightly curved rods, motile by flagella and form endospores. Its type strain is SAGM1T (= JCM 10712T = ATCC 700919T).

References

Further reading

External links

LPSN
Type strain of Alkaliphilus transvaalensis at BacDive -  the Bacterial Diversity Metadatabase

Clostridiaceae
Bacteria described in 2001